Wild Child is a 2008 teen comedy film directed by Nick Moore and starring Emma Roberts, Natasha Richardson, Shirley Henderson, Alex Pettyfer and Aidan Quinn, with Georgia King, Kimberley Nixon, Juno Temple, Linzey Cocker and Sophie Wu. Roberts portrays Poppy Moore, a wealthy and spoiled American teenager who is sent to a boarding school in England by her widowed father, where she soon learns the true meaning of life and friendship. This was Richardson's final film role before her death the following year.

Plot
Poppy Moore, a wealthy but spoiled and rebellious teenager from Malibu, California, damages and discards the belongings of her widowed father's new girlfriend, Rosemary. She grabs a handful of Rosemary's clothes and jumps into the ocean just as her furious father, Gerry, arrives. Gerry announces he will be sending Poppy to Abbey Mount, a boarding school in England, in the hopes that attending the school will turn her life around. When Poppy arrives at Abbey Mount, she is warmly greeted by the headmistress Mrs. Kingsley, and later the head girl, Harriet Bentley, who is disgusted by her sense of entitlement. Poppy learns to her dismay that the bedrooms are communal and is introduced to Kate, Josie, Kiki and Jennifer, also known as "Drippy". She is initially hostile towards her new roommates upon meeting them, and her behaviour gets them into trouble when she insults the Matron, who confiscates their cellphones and gives them three weeks of detention.

When Kate asks Poppy about her mother, she reveals that she died in a car crash when Poppy was eleven years old. Kate lets Poppy use her actual cellphone to message her friend from back home, Ruby, who is secretly cheating with Poppy's boyfriend, Roddy. The girls decide to help Poppy get expelled from Abbey Mount by carrying out several pranks, which gradually brings them closer together. When none of their plans work, they decide to have Poppy seduce Mrs. Kingsley's son, Freddie, who is forbidden from fraternizing with the female students. After the girls go shopping at a charity shop, they take Poppy to a hair salon for a makeover, where hairdresser Mr. Christopher removes her blonde hair dye and reveals her natural brunette hair. At the school dance, Freddie rejects Harriet in favour of dancing with Poppy, much to Harriet's dismay. Poppy trips on the dancefloor and Freddie takes her outside for fresh air, where he asks her out on a date. 

The next day, Poppy discovers her newfound talent for lacrosse and becomes the team's new captain. After several weeks of practicing and improving their skills, the team advances to the finals for the first time since 1976. Finding themselves falling in love with one another, Poppy and Freddie go for a drive in the countryside, where Freddie takes Poppy out for lunch and they kiss. Poppy returns to school only to find her roommates reading an email allegedly written by her, suggesting she was pretending to be friends with them so she could get herself expelled and return to Malibu. Poppy claims she did not write the emails, but the girls refuse to listen and walk out on her. When Freddie receives a similar email, Poppy tries to explain herself, but he slams the door in her face. With no one else to turn to, Poppy sneaks into the kitchen and calls Ruby, who accidentally reveals her affair with Roddy and hangs up on her. 

Feeling even more alone, Poppy starts playing with her lighter and accidentally sets a curtain on fire. Hearing footsteps, she quickly puts out the fire and runs back to her bedroom, but a few minutes later, Drippy sees the curtains engulfed in flames and is locked inside the freezer. When Poppy is awoken by the sound of an explosion, she looks out the window and sees the fire growing and immediately wakes the school. When everyone realizes Drippy is missing, Poppy runs into the burning school to rescue her. After the fire is extinguished, Freddie finds her lighter and gives it back to her, refusing to hear any explanation. Realizing she no longer wants to leave, Poppy writes an apology letter to Freddie and later goes to Mrs. Kingsley's office to take the blame for the fire. Afterwards, she finds a portrait of her late mother in the 1976 Abbey Mount lacrosse team and begins to cry upon realizing her mother had attended the school. 

While Poppy waits for the Honour Court to decide whether or not she should be expelled, Freddie finds her crying and becomes convinced the fire was an accident, and forgives her. Meanwhile, Drippy reads aloud Poppy's diary, revealing how much Poppy likes her roommates, and Kiki discovers who actually wrote the emails. At the hearing, Poppy gives her testimony and Harriet is determined to prove her guilt, while Poppy's roommates arrive and begin whispering to the other girls. When they all stand up in support of Poppy, Harriet bursts into a tirade and mentions Poppy's lighter. The girls realize that no lighter was ever mentioned and Mrs. Kingsley questions how Harriet knew about the lighter. When Poppy deduces that Harriet was responsible, Harriet snaps at her and accidentally confesses to restarting the fire after Poppy had put it out. A furious Mrs. Kingsley demands to see Harriet in her office and Poppy is absolved. 

At the lacrosse finals, Gerry arrives and is taken aback by Poppy's dramatic change in personality and how much she resembles her mother. Abbey Mount wins the lacrosse championship and Poppy, who admits that her father did the right thing by enrolling her at the school, reconciles with him. The next morning, Harriet is expelled and prepares to leave with her father, but not before Harriet's former friends toss her dead foxes out the window and onto her. Several months later, Poppy and Freddie have resumed their relationship, and she invites her roommates to a pool party at her Malibu mansion. When Freddie notices Ruby trying to call Poppy, she ignores her, now well aware she is not a real friend, and the girls prepare to jump into the ocean.

Cast

Production
The interiors of the boarding school were filmed at Cobham Hall in Kent. The facade of the school was filmed at Balls Park. They also filmed at 82 Main Street, 84 Main Street, 117 Main Street, and at the Brontë Parsonage Museum in Haworth, Keighley, Bradford. Filming also took place in Harrogate, and at Robin Hood's Bay in North Yorkshire.

Reception
Wild Child was released in the United Kingdom on 15 August 2008, taking fifth place at the box office with $2,196,366 from 359 cinemas with an average of $6,118. In its fourth weekend, it dropped to twelfth place. As of November 2008, Wild Child had grossed $8,235,794. In Australia, Wild Child was released 18 September, taking fourth place with only 93 cinemas and making $315,114. The following week, it made a 60% increase with $566,918 but still slipped to 6th place. On 16 October, Wild Child fell to 11th. As of November 2008, Wild Child had grossed US$3,268,424 (A$4,236,579) in Australia. The film has been released in many other countries, proving popular in some: the Netherlands ($1,553,825) and not so popular in others. The film has grossed a worldwide total of $21,972,336. Universal had planned a North American release in the summer of 2009, but canceled it and chose to release the film directly to DVD.

Critical response
Wild Child has a 41% approval rating at Rotten Tomatoes, based on 27 reviews with an average rating of 4.8/10. The website's critical consensus reads, "More mild than wild. This tween comedy mess falls flat on its face due to poor characters, poor direction and poor jokes". The Sun Online gave the film 2/5 saying "WILD? More like mild, unless you think short skirts and 'horse face' put-downs are outrageous." Urban Cinefile gave Wild Child a much more favourable review, stating "The film has an energy and honesty about it: it's lively, funny and smart and the characters are appealing."

Rating the film 2 out of 5 stars, The Guardian's Peter Bradshaw deemed the film's story and characters "amiable enough, but still a bit tame" compared to films such as Clueless and Freaky Friday. Describing Wild Child as "A tweenie comedy with an uplifting American-style sports movie awkwardly bolted on", David Gritten of The Daily Telegraph considered the film to be "a mess" with predictable plot twists and inferior to the film Angus, Thongs and Perfect Snogging. In a mostly positive review for Variety, Leslie Felperin wrote that Dahl's script "puts more emphasis on character development and plot mechanics than the recent, slapstick-laden, girls’-school-set "St. Trinian's," and still manages to have funnier one-liners". Felperin also found that the film's "third-act endorsement of female friendship turns out to be surprisingly affecting, despite obvious sentimentality." Meanwhile, Jack Wilson of The Age took a different view of the characters' development, finding that Dahl's screenplay "dwells unpleasantly on cruelty and humiliation, and finally Poppy does little more than exchange one form of snobbery for another."

DVD release
Wild Child was released on DVD in the United Kingdom on 8 December 2008. In Australia, it was released on 15 January 2009. In the United States, it was released directly to DVD on 17 November 2009.

Soundtrack

Wild Child: The Movie Soundtrack Party Album is a soundtrack album by the film of the same name, released in the United Kingdom and Australia on 18 August 2008. In the United States, the soundtrack wasn't released.

Track listing

Other songs non-included
The following songs appeared in the movie and trailers, although they were not included on the soundtrack for the film, due to licensing restrictions:

 "Angels" – Robbie Williams
 "Black Gloves" – Goose
 "Chasing Pavements" – Adele
 "Heaven Is a Place on Earth" – Belinda Carlisle
 "I Got It from My Mama" – will.i.am
 "Real Wild Child" – Everlife
 "Roadkill Morning" – Children of Bodom
 "Set 'Em Up" – Imran Hanif
  "You Think I Don't Care" - Jack McManus
 "Surrender Your Groove" – Geri Halliwell
 "Toxic" (instrumental) – Britney Spears

References

External links

 
 
 
 

2008 films
2008 directorial debut films
2008 romantic comedy films
2000s American films
2000s British films
2000s English-language films
2000s French films
2000s teen comedy films
2000s teen romance films
American romantic comedy films
American teen comedy films
American teen romance films
British romantic comedy films
British teen comedy films
British teen romance films
English-language French films
Films about bullying
Films directed by Nick Moore
Films produced by Eric Fellner
Films produced by Tim Bevan
Films set in boarding schools
Films set in Bradford
Films set in Malibu, California
Films set in Yorkshire
Films shot at Elstree Film Studios
Films shot in Bradford
Films shot in Harrogate
Films shot in Kent
Films shot in Los Angeles
Films shot in North Yorkshire
Films shot in Scarborough
Films shot in West Yorkshire
French romantic comedy films
French teen comedy films
Relativity Media films
StudioCanal films
Universal Pictures films
Working Title Films films